Yamato Hime no Ōkimi (倭姫王) was a poet and Empress of Japan, as the wife of her paternal uncle Emperor Tenji. She was a granddaughter of Emperor Jomei (舒明天皇) and Soga no Hote-no-iratsume (蘇我法提郎女), through their son Prince Furuhito-no-Ōe (古人大兄皇子).

Her poetry is collected in the Man'yōshū (万葉集), the oldest existing collection of Japanese poetry believed to have been collected by Ōtomo no Yakamochi (大伴 家持). After the death of her husband in 671, she wrote a song of mourning about him.

Notes

People of Asuka-period Japan
Emperor Tenji
7th-century Japanese women writers
7th-century Japanese writers
Japanese empresses
Year of birth missing
Year of death missing
Man'yō poets